Eureka Peak is a mountain in the Black Rock Canyon region of Joshua Tree National Park in the U.S. state of California. The peak is the 4th highest summit in the park after Quail Mountain,  Queen Mountain and Inspiration Peak. The Eureka Peak Road, an unpaved dirt road, leads up to the summit from Upper Covington Flat and is drivable by 4-wheel drive vehicles under suitable conditions. Mountain biking is also very popular on this peak.

An alternative route, the Eureka Peak Trail, branches off the California Riding and Hiking Trail and ascends the peak from the north.

The upper slopes of the mountain may occasionally see snow in winter.

References

External links
 MbPost-Eureka Peak
 Black Rock Canyon Map (by the NPS)
 Outdoor.com - Eureka Peak Trail

Mountains of Riverside County, California
Mountains of Southern California